Mukaya Payam is situated in Lainya County in central Equatoria State, South Sudan; It was a former local administrator head for current Yei river county. The name (Mukaya) originated from Hill located about in central of the Mukaya geographical land, which is around 9 to 12 miles north of Yei river County. The Mukaya differentiates into smaller clans of Dimo (1), Dimo (2), Dimo na Godo, Rume, Kendire, Goromba, Mingale, Jolobong, Mijikango, Dongbong, Pisak, Piyasuk, Bori, Yondoru, Sowaka, Ligi, Girim, Yensot, Migibura, Bono, Muresuku, Morsak, Gokoni, Malari, Worokosuk, Bujang, Mika, Warijang, Gori, Kobo, Nyori, Morsak, Bonga, Mikatom, Jubor,  and a few other smaller ones. The population of the Mukaya Payam is estimated to be 15,000 persons.

Mukaya Bomas

Environment, economy and natural resources

The environment in Mukaya Payam is typically tropical but the weather regime is fast changing; becoming arid with less rain and long dry spells. Mukaya economy is predominantly agrarian. Locally Mukaya Payam contributes 10% of food to the Yei river county economy. The majority of people are peasant practicing mixed farming; subsistence agriculture in which the main crops are cassava, sorghum, maize, simsim, groundnut, cow peas etc. The people in Mukaya Payam keeps goats, sheep and few cattle but the prevalence of tsetse fly has rendered cattle herding difficult. There are thick local forests around the hill of Mukaya which is the reason for the tsetse fly's existence. Beside the local thick forests there is also agro forestry.

Mythology and history

Mukaya is original known to current Pojulu of Mukaya Payam, the people and their relation to the Bari and other Bari-speaking ethnic communities in Central Equatoria State, South Sudan.

Education
List of schools in Mukaya Payam

Economic activities
Subsistence agriculture is the main economic activity in the Payam, as is the case with most South Sudan payams.

See also
Central Equatoria
James Elioba Sururu
Lainya county
Pojulu Tribe
Yei, South Sudan

References

History of Sudan
Separatism in Africa
Geography of South Sudan